Salmon Arm Airport , also known as Shuswap Regional Airport, is  southeast of Salmon Arm, British Columbia, Canada. Visual and GPS (CAP) approach is available. Fuel is Petro-Canada branded, Jet A and 100LL are both available.

References

External links

Certified airports in British Columbia
Salmon Arm